Tom Schultz was a U.S. soccer player who earned one cap with the U.S. national team in a 6-3 loss to England on June 8, 1953.
  He played his club soccer with St. Louis Kutis S.C. and was inducted into the St. Louis Soccer Hall of Fame in 1992.

American soccer players
United States men's international soccer players
St. Louis Kutis players
Living people
Association footballers not categorized by position
Year of birth missing (living people)